Laytonia is an extinct genus of prehistoric halosaur that lived in deep water off the North American Pacific Coast from the Zemorrian Epoch (comprising either the latest Oligocene or lower Miocene) until during the Upper Miocene subepoch, when tectonic uplift effectively destroyed the genus' habitat by making the deep water too shallow.

There are two species recognized, the type species, L. californica, which is known from at least 2 whole fossils, and fossil scales from Upper Miocene strata of Southern California, and L. zemorrensis, known from fossil scales in Zemorrian strata (either Oligocene or Lower Miocene) from Oregon and California.

According to the fossils of L. californica, the living animals were very slender, and had a long, fringe-like dorsal fin running almost the entire length of the body, from the head to the tip of the tail.  The dorsal fin forms two crests, a first, low crest on top of the back of the head, and a second, large crest near the upper back, above the pectoral fins.

The name comes from discoverer of the fossil, Melvin E. Layton.

See also

 Echidnocephalus, another genus of fossil  halosaur
 Prehistoric fish
 List of prehistoric bony fish

References

Halosauridae
Miocene fish of North America